South Lingyan Road is a station of Line 6 on the Shanghai Metro. It began operation on December 29, 2007 and served as the southern terminus of Line 6 until April 11, 2011 with the opening of Oriental Sports Center station.  It is located in Sanlin Town, Pudong. It was previously named Jiyang road. Line 11 passes through the station without stopping. An interchange is available at Oriental Sports Center. Although this station is underground, it is not fully covered.

References

Railway stations in Shanghai
Shanghai Metro stations in Pudong
Railway stations in China opened in 2007
Line 6, Shanghai Metro